Young-kun Kim (김영군, born November 29, 1946), known as Y.K. Kim, is a Korean-born taekwondo martial artist who resides in Florida. Kim was the producer and main actor of the film Miami Connection. He also publishes Martial Arts World Magazine, a quarterly magazine for professionals in the martial arts, and wrote the book Winning Is a Choice.

Early life
Kim received a taekwondo black belt at age 13, making him among the youngest in Korea to do so. At first, he studied and taught in Korea, and in 1976  he moved to Buenos Aires, Argentina, and taught there. In 1977, he moved to New York City, and to Orlando, Florida a year later, where he opened Y.K. Kim's TaeKwon-Do, his first taekwondo school. The school became the Martial Arts World, a franchise that Erin Sullivan of the Orlando Weekly described as "the McDonald's of martial arts schools" in Central Florida. The school was originally on Robinson Street, then on Mills Avenue, then its current location on Colonial Drive. As of 1988, Kim only claimed ownership of the East Colonial Drive school. As of then, the other schools are part of the American TaeKwon-Do Federation, which Kim founded. The federation establishes the philosophies and rules used by the schools within the federation.

Career
In the mid-1980s, Korean film director Richard Park met Kim after seeing Kim interviewed on the Korean talk show Meet at 11 p.m. (11시에 만납시다) and the two agreed to produce a film, Miami Connection. Originally, the film had a very limited release with no significant attention. The film's production almost bankrupted Kim. In the meantime, he established his business and became a motivational speaker. In 2012, the Alamo Drafthouse Cinema redistributed Miami Connection, leading to a positive reception and subsequent cult following.

Other ventures
In 2002, Kim and Choung Byoung-gug, a legislator in Korea, proposed a Korea pavilion at Epcot.

References

Further reading
 Gordon, Cheryl (compiled by). "Tak Kwon Do." Orlando Sentinel. October 11, 1987. Orange Sentinel South p. 19.

External links

 Y.K. Kim Official Website
 

Living people
American people of Korean descent
American male taekwondo practitioners
Sportspeople from Orlando, Florida
Culture of Orlando, Florida
1956 births